Valadares is a former civil parish in the municipality of Vila Nova de Gaia, Portugal. In 2013, the parish merged into the new parish Gulpilhares e Valadares. The population in 2011 was 10,678, in an area of 5.14 km2.

Today the shoreside vicinity is very popular for its nightlife and the bars along its well-known beach.  It is also possible to see some old sanatoriums used mostly in the 1940s and 1950s to treat people suffering from bone fractures and diseases like tuberculosis. The sanatoriums were established here because the region is extremely rich in iodine, valuable for its antiseptic uses in medicine.

Valadares is also very famous for Cerâmica de Valadares that today it is considered the biggest and most varied National Manufacture provider of sanitary ware and ceramic fittings.
There is a  train station.

Coat of arms and flag 

The coat of arms are made up of a ceramic vase on the center with a dentate wheel behind, on the left is maize and on the right a shield over the water, on the bottom is water.  The flag has two white and two blue squares.

The ceramic vase with a dentate wheel represents the ceramic industry and the archaeological findings.  The maize represents the fields in Vila Chá.  The shield represents the shields of Vila Nova de Gaia coat of arms.  The water represents the ocean and the beach of Valadares. The colors blue and white represent the ocean and foam of the waves.

History 

The name Valadares originates from the word "Vallado", that means obstacle.  That may be the "Crasto de Valadares" a fortification from the second period of the Iron Age (450 b.C.).  This "Crastos" on the northwest of Iberian Peninsula, goes from the 5th century B.C. to AD 5th century. In the Middle Ages, Valadares belonged to the Monastery of Grijó. During the first half of the 20th century, Valadares enjoyed a considerable development, being one of the most developed parishes of Gaia, due to the existence of the Cerâmica de Valadares, one important Train Station, Sanatoriums, several Schools and a theatre (Cine-teatro Eduardo Brazão).

Culture 

There is a traditional dessert in Valadares - The "Velhote", a kind of sweet bread with lemon and cinnamon. The origin of this dessert isn't cleared yet, but most people believe that it was created in the 19th century by a lady who came from Braga. It is said that when king Carlos I and queen Amelia went to Oporto, they ate "Velhotes".

The patron of Valadares is S. Salvador.

Media

Newspapers 
Valadares & a Cidade em Foco

Places 

Valadares is divided in 13 places.

 Aldeia
 Barroco
 Campolinho
 Crasto
 Chamorra
 Estação
 Pedreiras
 Penedo
 Praia de Valadares
 Sameiros
 Tartumil
 Valadarinhos
 Vila-Chã

References

 
Former parishes of Vila Nova de Gaia